is a Japanese kickboxer, and the current Battle of Muaythai Flyweight champion. He is the former Lumpinee, Rajadamnern, IBF Muaythai and WBC Muaythai champion at mini flyweight.

He is also known as Nadaka Eiwasports gym (th: นาดากะ เอวะสปอร์ตยิม) in Thailand and works as a kickboxing instructor.
And he becomes ambassador for the WBC MuayThai Youth Development Program.

Biography

Amateur career
On December 12, 2015, Nadaka fought against Hidenojo Shimizu (40 kg class #2) for the vacant title of SMASHERS 40 kg class championship, and won by unanimous decision. He was rated #1 at 40 kg class and won 16th belt in his career.

Professional career 
On April 3, 2016, Nadaka fought against Riichi Hoshino, and won by majority decision after 3R.

On May 6, Nadaka challenged for Isan Area (North-East area in Thailand) 42 kg class title in Buriram Province, Thailand, but lost by decision after 5R.

Winning WMC, WBC and IBF titles
On November 13, 2016, Nadaka challenged Shushap Tor Ittiporn for his WMC Pinweight World title, but he lost by unanimous decision.

On April 9, 2017, Nadaka fought against Yaksaed Siriluck Muaythai for the vacant WMC World Pinweight title, and won by KO.

Winning Lumpinee and Rajadamnern Stadium titles
On December 9, 2018, Nadaka fought against Hercules Phetsimean, the Rajadamnern & Lumpinee unified  Mini flyweight champion, for his Rajadamnern titile, and he won by unanimous decision after 5R.

On February 7, 2019, Nadaka fought against Bakjo Auddonmuang at Lumpinee Boxing Stadium in Bangkok, Thailand as a non-title 106 lbs bout and won by TKO with a left cross at 3R. Originally, he was going to fight against Olaylek Sor.Kaenjai.

On February 24, 2019, Nadaka fought against Bigone Sor.Sirilux for the vacant title of Lumpinee Boxing Stadium of Japan (LPNJ) Mini flyweight championship, and this bout was also for Nadaka's test match for challenging Lumpinee Boxing Stadium title. He knocked out Bigone by KO with left body hook at 1R 2:29.

On April 14, 2019, Nadako fought against Singdum Kafaefogus for the vacant title of Lumpinee Boxing Stadium Mini flyweight championship which had been returned by Hercules Phetsimean, and he won by unanimous decision after 5R. Nadaka became the current champion of 3 titles of Lumpinee Boxing Stadium, Rajadamnern Boxing Stadium, and International Boxing Federation Muaythai.

Yoshinari fought Kengkla Numponthep for the vacant Muay Thai Naikhanomtom Association (MNA) Light Flyweight title, in June 2019. He won the fight by unanimous decision.

In his next fight, on July 18, 2019, Yoshinari fought Isantai Sitchefboontham for the IBF Muay Thai World Light Flyweight title. Sitchefboontham won the fight by decision.

BoM Flyweight champion
In December 2019, Yoshinari participated in the Battle of Muay Thai Flyweight tournament, to crown the new BoM Flyweight champion. In the semifinals, he knocked Lee Ji Sung out midway through the first round. In the finals, Yoshinari knocked Chi Yeung Fung out, with a head kick in the first round.

In 2020, Yoshinari fought three times: he won a unanimous decision against Takuto Wor.Wanchai at BOM WAVE 01, a second round TKO of Yuushin at Rizin 22, and a second round knockout of Hidetora Abe at BOM WAVE 02. In his last fight of the year, Yoshinari was scheduled to fight Phetmalai Phetjaroenvit at Rizin 26. He knocked Phetmalai out in the first round.

Yoshinari was scheduled to fight Ibuki Bravely at BOM WAVE 04. He won the fight by a first-round left elbow knockout.

Yoshinari faced Chiakai, under kickboxing rules, at Rizin 29 – Osaka. He won the fight by a first-round technical knockout, after the ringside doctor stopped the fight inbetween the rounds.

Yoshinari faced Hitoshi Sato at BOM – ouroboros 2021 – on September 26, 2021. He won the fight by a first-round knockout.

Yoshinari faced Naoki Ishikawa at Rizin 31 - Yokohama on October 24, 2021. He won the bout via TKO after knocking down his opponent three times in the first round.

Yoshinari faced Khun NamIsan Shobukai for the WBC Muay Thai Super Bantamweight Nai Khanom Tom Challenge title at BOM WAVE 07 – Get Over The COVID-19 on December 5, 2021. He won the fight by unanimous decision.

Yoshinari was booked to face Yusei Shirahata at Rizin Landmark 2 on March 6, 2022. He won the fight by a second-round knockout.

Yoshinari was scheduled to face Phetnipon Sak.ChorRorBor for the Thailand flyweight (50.8kg) championship at BOM WAVE 08 on April 24, 2022. Due to covid restrictions Phetnipon was replaced on short notice by Keito Naito. The bout would be competed at 55kg, the heaviest weight in career for Nadaka. Nadaka won the fight by technical knockout in the second round when Naito's corner threw the towel after their fighter was knocked down for the third time.

Yoshinari was rescheduled to face Phetnipon Sak.ChorRorBor for the Thailand flyweight (50.8kg) championship at BOM 36 on July 3, 2022. On June 22, it was revealed that the vacant WPMF Flyweight title would be on the line as well. Yoshinari won the fight by second round knockout with a left elbow strike.

Yoshinari faced Bandasak So Trakunpet at Super Rizin on September 25, 2022. He won the fight by a first-round technical knockout.

Yoshinari faced Chaichana Wor.WisetGym at JKA "KICK Insist 14" on November 20, 2022. He won the fight by a second-round knockout.

Championships and accomplishments

Amateur
 2012 Bigbang Amateur -28kg Champion
 2013 Bigbang Amateur -31kg Champion
 2014 All Japan SMASHERS Tournament -35kg Winner
 2014 Muay Thai Windy Sports -35kg Champion
 2014 Battle Of Muaythai (BOM) -32.5kg Champion 
 2014 Battle Of Muaythai (BOM) -35 kg tournament winner
 2015 MAJKF Kick Jr -37kg Champion
 2015 Dragon Boxing Stadium (DBS) Kids -35 kg tournament winner
 2015 WBC Muaythai All Japan Jr League -37 kg tournament winner
 2015 Suk Wan Kingtong Real Champion Tournament -38kg Winner
 2015 SMASHERS -40 kg champion

Professional
 World Muaythai Council
 2017 WMC World Pinweight champion

 World Boxing Council Muaythai
 2018 WBC Muaythai World  Mini flyweight Champion
 2018 WBC Muaythai Young Fighter of the Year
 2021 WBC Muaythai Nai Khanom Tom Super Bantamweight Champion

International Boxing Federation Muaythai
 2018 IBF Muaythai World Mini flyweight championRajadamnern Stadium 2018 Rajadamnern Stadium Mini flyweight championLumpinee Boxing Stadium of Japan 2019 LPNJ Mini flyweight ChampionLumpinee Boxing Stadium 2019 Lumpinee Boxing Stadium Mini flyweight ChampionMuaythai Nai Khanom Tom Association 2019 MNA Light flyweight ChampionThe Battle of Muaythai 2019 BoM Flyweight ChampionProfessional Boxing Association of Thailand (PAT) 
2022 Thailand Flyweight ChampionWorld Professional Muaythai Federation 
2022 WPMF World Flyweight ChampionAwardseFight.jp3x Fighter of the Month (December 2018, April 2019, July 2022)

Fight record
Professional

|-  style="background:#;"
| 2023-04-09 || || align=left| Songchainoi Kiatsongrit  || BOM Ouroboros 2023 || Tokyo, Japan ||   || ||

|-  style="background:#cfc;"
| 2023-02-25 || Win || align=left| Patakhin SinbiMuayThai  || RWS + Palangmai, Rajadamnern Stadium || Bangkok, Thailand || KO (High kick)|| 3 || 2:02

|-  style="background:#cfc;"
| 2022-12-11 ||Win || align=left| Kuryu  || BOM 37 || Yokohama, Japan || Decision (Unanimous) ||5  ||3:00

|-  style="background:#cfc;"
| 2022-11-20 || Win || align=left| Chaichana Wor.WisetGym || JKA "KICK Insist 14" || Tokyo, Japan || KO (Left hook to the body) || 2 || 0:46 

|-  style="background:#cfc;"
| 2022-09-25 || Win || align=left| Bandasak Sor.Trakunpet || Super Rizin || Saitama, Japan || TKO (Ref stop./Knee to the body) || 1 || 2:24
|-

|-  style="background:#cfc;"
| 2022-07-03 || Win|| align=left| Phetnipon Sak.ChorRorBor || BOM 36 || Yokohama, Japan || KO (Left elbow)  ||2  ||2:22 
|-
! style=background:white colspan=9 |

|-  style="background:#cfc;"
| 2022-04-24|| Win|| align=left| Keito Naito || BOM WAVE 08 || Beppu, Japan || TKO (Corner stoppage)  || 2 || 2:34

|-  style="background:#cfc;"
| 2022-03-06|| Win || align=left| Yusei Shirahata || Rizin Landmark 2 || Tokyo, Japan || KO (Left cross)  || 2 ||1:02 
|-  style="background:#cfc;"
| 2021-12-05|| Win|| align=left| Khun NamIsan Shobukai||  BOM WAVE 07 The 1st – Get Over The COVID-19 – || Tokyo, Japan || Decision (Unanimous) ||5  ||3:00  
|-
! style=background:white colspan=9 |
|-  style="background:#cfc;"
| 2021-10-24|| Win || align=left| Naoki Ishikawa || Rizin 31 - Yokohama || Yokohama, Japan || TKO (3 knockdwons) || 1 ||2:30 
|-  style="background:#cfc;"
| 2021-09-26|| Win || align=left| Hitoshi Sato||  The Battle of MuayThai – Ouroboros 2021 – || Tokyo, Japan || KO (Knee to the Body) ||1  ||1:23  

|-  style="background:#cfc;"
| 2021-06-27|| Win || align=left| Chikai || Rizin 29 – Osaka || Osaka, Japan || TKO (Doctor Stoppage)|| 1 || 3:00 
|-  style="background:#cfc;"
| 2021-04-11|| Win ||align=left| Ibuki Bravely|| BOM WAVE 04 pt.1 ~ Get Over The COVID-19 ~ || Yokohama, Japan || KO (Left Elbow)|| 1 || 2:24 
|-  style="background:#cfc;"
| 2020-12-31|| Win || align=left| Phetmalai Phetjaroenvit || Rizin 26 || Saitama, Japan || KO (3 Knockdowns)|| 1 || 2:19 
|-  style="background:#cfc;"
| 2020-10-04|| Win || align=left| Hidetora Abe || BOM WAVE 02 ~ Get Over The COVID-19 ~ || Yokohama, Japan || KO (Elbow)|| 2 || 2:39
|-  style="background:#cfc;"
| 2020-08-09 || Win ||align=left| Yuushin || Rizin 22 – Yokohama || Yokohama, Japan || TKO (Knees & Elbows)|| 2 || 3:08
|-  style="background:#cfc;"
| 2020-06-28 || Win ||align=left| Takuto Wor.Wanchai || BOM WAVE 01 ~ Get Over The COVID-19 ~ || Tokyo, Japan || Decision (Unanimous)|| 5 || 3:00 
|-  style="background:#cfc;"
| 2019-12-08 || Win ||align=left| Chi Yeung Fung || The Battle Of Muaythai BOM2-6 Part II, Flyweight Tournament Final|| Tokyo, Japan || KO (Left High Kick)|| 1 || 2:45 
|-
! style=background:white colspan=9 |
|-  style="background:#cfc;"
| 2019-12-08 || Win ||align=left| Lee Ji Sung || The Battle Of Muaythai BOM2-6 Part II, Flyweight Tournament Semi Final|| Tokyo, Japan || KO (Liver kick)|| 1 || 1:36 
|-  style="background:#cfc;"
| 2019-10-31 || Win ||align=left| Ekmuangkhon Mor.KrungthepThonburi  || Rajadamnern Stadium "Chujaroen Muay Thai" (114lbs bout) || Bangkok, Thailand || Decision|| 5 || 3:00 
|-  style="background:#c5d2ea;"
| 2019-09-10|| Draw ||align=left| Isantai Sitchefboontham || Siriluckmuaythai + UdUdon +BesChiangMai + EiwaSportGym Rajadamnern Stadium || Bangkok, Thailand || Decision || 5 || 3:00 
|-
! style=background:white colspan=9 |

|-  style="background:#FFBBBB;"
| 2019-07-18|| Loss ||align=left| Isantai Sitchefboontham || Sidchefboontham, Rajadamnern Stadium || Bangkok, Thailand || Decision || 5 || 3:00 
|-
! style=background:white colspan=9 |
|-  style="background:#cfc;"
| 2019-06-01 || Win ||align=left| Kengkla Numponthep ||  "BOM2-2 - The Battle Of Muay Thai Season II vol.2 -" || Yokohama, Japan || Decision (unanimous) || 5 || 3:00 
|-
! style=background:white colspan=9 |
|-
|-  style="background:#cfc;"
| 2019-04-14 || Win ||align=left| Singdam Kafaefogus || The Battle Of Muaythai SEASON 2 vol.1 || Yokohama, Japan  || Decision (unanimous) || 5 || 3:00 
|-
! style=background:white colspan=9 |
|-  style="background:#cfc;"
| 2019-02-24 || Win ||align=left| Bigone Sor.Sirilux || Saenchai Muaythai Gym "MuayThaiOpen 44" || Tokyo, Japan || KO (left body hook) || 1 || 2:29 
|-
! style=background:white colspan=9 |
|-
|-  style="background:#cfc;"
| 2019-02-07 || Win ||align=left| Bakjo Auddonmuang || Rajadamnern Stadium "Muaythai Rajadamnern+Chefboonthum" (106lbs non-title match) || Bangkok, Thailand || TKO (left cross)|| 3 ||  
|-
|-  style="background:#cfc;"
| 2018-12-09 || Win ||align=left| Hercules Phetsimean ||  "BOM XX The Battle Of Muay Thai 20"  || Yokohama, Japan || Decision (unanimous) || 5 || 3:00 
|-
! style=background:white colspan=9 |
|-
|-  style="background:#cfc;"
| 2018-09-26 || Win ||align=left| Roma Uddonmuang || Rajadamnern Stadium "Chefboonthum" || Bangkok, Thailand || TKO (ref. stoppage/Left body cross) || 1 ||  
|-
! style=background:white colspan=9 |
|-
|-  style="background:#cfc;"
| 2018-07-01 || Win ||align=left| Bikwan Rasanon ||  "BOM XVIII The Battle Of Muay Thai 18" (WMC Mini flyweight sanctioning bout) || Yokohama, Japan || KO (Left bodyshot)|| 2 || 2:29 
|-
|-  style="background:#cfc;"
| 2018-06-18 || Win ||align=left| Jong Or.Chefboonthum || Omnoi Stadium "TV match" (105lbs non-title bout) ||  Samut Sakhon, Thailand || Decision (unanimous)|| 5 || 3:00 
|-
|-  style="background:#FFBBBB;"
| 2018-05-16 || Loss ||align=left| Phetmorakot Aooddonmuang || Rajadamnern Stadium "Chujaroen Muaythai" (105lbs non-title bout) || Bangkok, Thailand || Decision|| 5 || 3:00 
|-
|-  style="background:#cfc;"
| 2018-04-08 || Win ||align=left| Tuantong Singmanee ||  "BOM XVII The Battle Of Muay Thai 17" || Koto, Tokyo, Japan || Decision (unanimous) || 5 || 3:00 
|-
! style=background:white colspan=9 |
|-
|-  style="background:#cfc;"
| 2018-02-19 || Win ||align=left| Mong Sitpanumtong || Rajadamnern Stadium "Suek Chefboonthum" (104lbs non-title bout) || Bangkok, Thailand || KO (Left body cross)|| 4 ||  
|-
|-  style="background:#cfc;"
| 2017-12-20 || Win ||align=left| Jomwo Aooddonmuang || Rajadamnern Stadium "Suek Chefboonthum" (46.5kg non-title bout) || Bangkok, Thailand || KO (Left cross)|| 2 ||  
|-
|-  style="background:#cfc;"
| 2017-10-21 || Win ||align=left| Segai Latanon || Coral Z "Inoki Ism.2 - Inoki Living Funeral -" (Pinweight non-title match) || Sumida, Tokyo, Japan || Decision (unanimous)|| 3 || 3:00 
|-
|-  style="background:#cfc;"
| 2017-08-24 || Win ||align=left| Phetjing Lukbanyai || Rajadamnern Stadium "Suek Chefboonthum" (45kg non-title bout) || Bangkok, Thailand || Decision|| 5 || 3:00 
|-
|-  style="background:#cfc;"
| 2017-07-17 || Win ||align=left| Rifle Sor.Saksiam || Rajadamnern Stadium "Chefboonthum Fight" (45kg non-title bout) || Bangkok, Thailand || TKO|| 5 || 1:00 
|-
|-  style="background:#cfc;"
| 2017-04-09 || Win ||align=left| Yaksaed Siriluck Muaythai ||  "BOM XIV The Battle Of Muay Thai 14" || Tokyo, Japan || KO (Left elbow strike) || 3 || 1:52 
|-
! style=background:white colspan=9 |
|-
|-  style="background:#cfc;"
| 2016-12-04 || Win ||align=left| Yū Hiramatsu ||  "BOM XIII The Battle Of Muay Thai 13" (100lbs bout.)) || Yokohama, Japan || KO|| 3 || 2:52 
|-
|-  style="background:#FFBBBB;"
| 2016-11-13 || Loss ||align=left| Chusap Tor Ittipon || Shomukai "Muay Lok 2016 4th" || Tokyo, Japan || Decision (unanimous) || 5 || 3:00 
|-
! style=background:white colspan=9 |
|-
|-  style="background:#cfc;"
| 2016-09-30 || Win ||align=left| Chaiyai Chor.Sanpeenong || Max Muay Thai Stadium "MUAY THAI WORLD BATTLE" (43kg non-title bout.)|| Pattaya, Chonburi, Thailand || KO (Left knee body shot)|| 1 ||  
|-
|-  style="background:#cfc;"
| 2016-09-22 || Win ||align=left| Ekarin Sor.Jor.Toypadriw || Rajadamnern Stadium "Suek Jarumuang + Sor.Sommai" (93lbs non-title match.) || Bangkok, Thailand || KO|| 4 || ? 
|-
|-  style="background:#cfc;"
| 2016-09-04 || Win ||align=left| Dennongpok Phodaogym || Shomukai "Muay Lok 2016 3rd" (43kg non-title bout.) || Tokyo, Japan || KO (Left knee shot) || 2 || 2:57 
|-
|-  style="background:#cfc;"
| 2016-08-13 || Win ||align=left|  || Rangsit Stadium (44kg non-title bout.) || Pathum Thani Province, Thailand || TKO (corner stoppage)|| 2 || 3:00 
|-
|-  style="background:#cfc;"
| 2016-08-10 || Win ||align=left| Noknoi Sor Reunrom || Asiatique: Muay Thai Live (46kg non-title bout) || Bangkok, Thailand || Decision (unanimous)|| 3 || 3:00 
|-
|-  style="background:#FFBBBB;"
| 2016-07-03 || Loss ||align=left| Kaen Esan Sit Eakubom ||  "BOM 12 -The Battle Of Muay Thai 12-" (44kg non-title bout) || Kōtō, Tokyo, Japan || Decision (unanimous) || 5 || 3:00 
|-
|-  style="background:#FFBBBB;"
| 2016-05-06 || Loss ||align=left|  ||  || Buriram Province, Thailand || Decision || 5 || 3:00 
|-
! style=background:white colspan=9 |
|-
|-  style="background:#cfc;"
| 2016-04-03 || Win ||align=left| Riichi Hoshino ||  "BOM 11 -The Battle Of Muay Thai 11-" (45kg non-title bout)  || Tokyo, Japan || Decision (majority)|| 3 || 3:00 
|-  style="background:#cfc;"
| 2016-03-10 || Win ||align=left| Sergit Sor.Malaitong || Rajadamnern Stadium "Jarumuang Fight" (90lbs class non-title bout.) || Bangkok, Thailand || Decision (unanimous)|| 5 || 2:00 
|-  style="background:#cfc;"
| 2016-01-08 || Win ||align=left| Shaochu Youran || Worldwide MMA Alliance Championship Opening match (40kg class non-title match) || Kōtō, Tokyo, Japan || Decision|| 3 || 3:00 
|-  style="background:#cfc;"
| 2015-11-29 || Win ||align=left| Oley Phor.Homklin || Rajadamnern Stadium "Chujaroenmuaythai Fight" (38kg bout)|| Bangkok, Thailand || KO|| 2 ||  
|-  style="background:#fbb;"
| 2015-08-15 || Loss||align=left| Sudlo Phetbanpa || Lumpinee Stadium "Krirkkrai" || Bangkok, Thailand || Decision|| 5 ||2:00  
|-  style="background:#cfc;"
| 2015-06-20 || Win ||align=left| Phansaeng Sakwarun || Lumpinee Stadium "Krirkkrai" || Bangkok, Thailand || Decision || 5 ||2:00  
|-
| colspan=9 | Legend:    

Amateur

|-  style="background:#cfc;"
| 2015-12-20|| Win || align=left| Yuuga Kurosawa || Suk Wan Kingthong, Real Champion Tournament 38kg Final || Tokyo, Japan ||Decision||  || 
|-  style="background:#cfc;"
| 2015-12-20|| Win || align=left| Ruku Kondo|| Suk Wan Kingthong, Real Champion Tournament 38kg Semi Final || Tokyo, Japan || KO|| 1|| 
|-  style="background:#cfc;"
| 2015-12-12 || Win ||align=left| Hidenojō Shimizu || JAKF "SMASHERS Champion's Carnival 2015" || Kōtō, Tokyo, Japan || Decision (unanimous) || 2 || 1:30 
|-
! style=background:white colspan=9 |
|-  style="background:#cfc;"
| 2015-12-06 || Win ||align=left| Hyūga Satō || BOM promotion "BOM 10 -The Battle Of Muay Thai 10-" (37kg class non-title match) || Yokohama, Japan || Decision (unanimous)|| 5 || 2:00 
|-  style="background:#cfc;"
| 2015-08-30 || Win ||align=left| Shunpei Kitano || 1st WBC Muay Thai Junior League U-15 National Championship, Final || Kōtō, Tokyo, Japan ||  ||  ||  
|-
! style=background:white colspan=9 |
|-
|-  style="background:#cfc;"
| 2015-08-30 || Win ||align=left| Shō Iwao || 1st WBC Muay Thai Junior League U-15 National Championship, Semi-final || Kōtō, Tokyo, Japan ||  ||  ||  
|-
|-  style="background:#cfc;"
| 2015-08-02 || Win ||align=left| Ryusei Kumagai || MTSF "Amateur Competition Suk Wan Kingthong", Final || Ōta, Tokyo, Japan || TKO (referee stoppage) || 2 || 0:39 
|-
! style=background:white colspan=9 |
|-
|-  style="background:#cfc;"
| 2015-08-02 || Win ||align=left| Aito Sakurai || MTSF "Amateur Competition Suk Wan Kingthong", Semi-final || Ōta, Tokyo, Japan || KO (Referee stop/body shot)|| 1 || 1:30 
|-  style="background:#cfc;"
| 2015-07-26 || Win ||align=left| Shōta Noda || Dragon Gym "A-League 31 Deluxe", Final || Sendai, Miyagi, Japan || KO || 2 || 1:05 
|-
! style=background:white colspan=9 |
|-
|-  style="background:#cfc;"
| 2015-07-26 || Win ||align=left| Shūto Eba || Dragon Gym "A-League 31 Deluxe", Semi-final || Sendai, Miyagi, Japan || KO|| 1 || 0:18 
|-
|-  style="background:#cfc;"
| 2015-06-15 || Win ||align=left| Konomu Sugita || 174th JAKF authorization SMASHERS -40kg class match. || Ōta, Tokyo, Japan || Decision (unanimous)||  ||  
|-  style="background:#cfc;"
| 2015-04-29 || Win ||align=left| Kippei Niina || "-The Battle Of Muay Thai 8-"  || Yokohama, Japan || Decision (unanimous) || 5 || 2:00 
|-
|-  style="background:#cfc;"
| 2015-03-29 || Win ||align=left| Yushin Noguchi|| MuayThaiPhoon vol.1||  Nagoya, Japan || Decision (Unanimous)|| 2 || 2:00 
|-  style="background:#cfc;"
| 2015-03-08|| Win||align=left| Ryuya Okuwaki || MA Nihon Kick TRADITION 2～STAIRWAY TO DREAM|| Tokyo, Japan || Decision || 3 || 2:00 
|-
! style=background:white colspan=9 |
|-  style="background:#cfc;"
| 2014-12-21 || Win||align=left| Kippei Niina || WINDY SPORTS || Tokyo, Japan ||  Decision||5 ||  
|-
! style=background:white colspan=9 |
|-  style="background:#cfc;"
| 2014-12-14 || Win ||align=left| Shōgo Komiyama || 8th BOM Amateur Competition || Yokohama, Japan ||  || 2 || 2:00 
|-
|-  style="background:#cfc;"
| 2014-12-13 || Win ||align=left| Taiga Hori || JAKF SMASHERS Tournament, Final|| Tokyo, Japan ||  Decision||  ||  
|-  style="background:#cfc;"
| 2014-12-13 || Win ||align=left| || JAKF SMASHERS Tournament, Semi Final|| Tokyo, Japan ||  Decision||  ||  
|-
|-  style="background:#cfc;"
| 2014-10-19 || Win ||align=left| Asahi Shinagawa || WPMF BOM Amateur competition, Final || Yokohama, Japan || || 2 || 2:00 
|-
! style=background:white colspan=9 |
|-
|-  style="background:#cfc;"
| 2014-10-19 || Win ||align=left| Chihiro Sugiyama || WPMF BOM Amateur competition, Semi-final || Yokohama, Japan ||  || 2 || 2:00 
|-
|-
|-  style="background:#cfc;"
| 2014-10-19 || Win ||align=left| Shōgo Nakajima || WPMF BOM Amateur competition, Quarter-final || Yokohama, Japan ||  || 2 || 2:00 
|-
|-
|-  style="background:#cfc;"
| 2014-10-13 || Win ||align=left| Shiyū Aoyama || Muaythai WINDY Super Fight vol.18 in Kyoto  || Kameoka, Kyoto, Japan || KO|| 2 ||  
|-  style="background:#cfc;"
| 2014-08-17 || Win||align=left| Kippei Niina|| MUAYTHAI WINDY SUPER FIGHT vol.17 ||  Tokyo, Japan || Decision (Unanimous)||3 || 2:00 
|- style="background:#cfc;"
| 2014-06-29||Win|| align="left" | Ryuya Okuwaki ||Muay Thai WINDY Super Fight vol.16, Final ||Tokyo, Japan|| Decision (Unanimous)|| 5|| 1:00 
|-
! style=background:white colspan=9 |
|- style="background:#cfc;"
| 2014-06-29||Win|| align="left" | Kojiro Vonhoose ||Muay Thai WINDY Super Fight vol.16, Semi Final ||Tokyo, Japan|| KO||1 ||  
|- style="background:#cfc;"
| 2014-06-29||Win|| align="left" | Issei Koizumi ||Muay Thai WINDY Super Fight vol.16, Quarter Final ||Tokyo, Japan|||| ||  
|- style="background:#cfc;"
| 2014-06-29||Win|| align="left" | Yuto Ideguchi ||Muay Thai WINDY Super Fight vol.16, First Round||Tokyo, Japan|||| ||  
|-  style="background:#cfc;"
| 2014-05-06 || Win||align=left| Reito Komiyama || BOM Amateur 6 ||  Tokyo, Japan || Decision|| 3 || 2:00 
|-
! style=background:white colspan=9 |
|-  style="background:#cfc;"
| 2014-04-13 || Win ||align=left| Asahi Shinagawa ||  BOM Amateur 5 || Yokohama, Japan || Decision|| ||  
|-  style="background:#cfc;"
| 2014-03-23 || Win ||align=left| Arashi Kajiwara || HoostCup Legend -Densetsu Kourin- || Nagoya, Aichi, Japan || Decision (unanimous) || 3 || 2:00 
|-
|-  style="background:#cfc;"
| 2014-01-19 || Win ||align=left| Michiharu Nara || 4th BOM Amateur Competition, Final || Yokohama, Japan ||  || 2 ||2:00  
|-
! style=background:white colspan=9 |
|-
|-  style="background:#cfc;"
| 2014-01-19 || Win ||align=left| Shota Okudaira || 4th BOM Amateur Competition, Semi-final || Yokohama, Japan ||  || 2 || 2:00 
|-
|-
|-  style="background:#cfc;"
| 2014-01-19 || Win ||align=left| Haruki Ohno || 4th BOM Amateur Competition, Quarter-final || Yokohama, Japan ||  || 2 || 2:00 
|-
|-
|-  style="background:#cfc;"
| 2013-12-01 || Win ||align=left| Asahi Shinagawa  || 3rd BOM Amateur Competition, Final || Yokohama, Kanagawa, Japan ||  || 2 || 2:00 
|-
! style=background:white colspan=9 |
|-
|-  style="background:#cfc;"
| 2013-12-01 || Win ||align=left| Hyuga Umemoto || 3rd BOM Amateur Competition, Semi-final || Yokohama, Japan ||  || 2 || 2:00 
|-
|-  style="background:#c5d2ea;"
| 2013|| Draw ||align=left| Toki Tamaru || TNT Amateur YZD Gym || Tokyo, Japan || Decision || 2 || 2:00 
|-
|-  style="background:#FFBBBB;"
| 2013-09-08 || Loss ||align=left| Shōgo Nakajima || 2nd BOM Amateur Competition, Quarter-final || Yokohama, Japan ||  || 2 ||2:00  
|-
|-  style="background:#cfc;"
| 2013-08-12 || Win||align=left| || Queen's Birthday || Bangkok, Thailand || Decision|| 5 ||2:00  
|-  style="background:#cfc;"
| 2013-07-14 || Win ||align=left| Jukiya Itō || 15th Bigban Amateur Kickboxing Competition || Ōta, Tokyo, Japan ||  || 3 || 2:00 
|-
! style=background:white colspan=9 |
|-
|-  style="background:#c5d2ea;"
| 2013-04-14 || Draw ||align=left| Ryū Kanno || BOM promotion "BOM 1 -The Battle Of Muay Thai 1- Part.1" || Yokohama, Japan || Decision (Split) || 2 || 2:00 
|-
|-  style="background:#cfc;"
| 2013-03-10 || Win ||align=left| Tōma Sugihara || Bigbang the future VI ||  || Decision || 3 || 2:00 
|-
! style=background:white colspan=9 |
|-
|-  style="background:#cfc;"
| 2012-12-23 || Win ||align=left| Kento Itō || 1st Japan Amateur Muaythai Championship and 2013 WMF Qualification tournament, Final || Kōtō, Tokyo, Japan ||  ||  ||  
|-
! style=background:white colspan=9 |
|-
|-  style="background:#cfc;"
| 2012-11-11 || Win ||align=left| Ikkō Ōta || Jawin presents Bigbang the future V ||  Ōta, Tokyo, Japan ||  ||  ||  
|-
! style=background:white colspan=9 |
|-
|-  style="background:#cfc;"
| 2012-08-05 || Win ||align=left| Ikkō Ōta || Muay Yoko 19 - 29kg non-title bout || Yokohama, Japan || Decision (Majority)|| 2 || 1:30 
|-  style="background:#FFBBBB;"
| 2012-06-24 || Loss ||align=left| Ryuya Okuwaki || Muay Yoko 18 - 29kg non-title bout  || Ōta, Tokyo, Japan || Decision (Uanimous)|| Ex1 || 1:30 
|-  style="background:#cfc;"
| 2012-06-24 || Win ||align=left| Tokimitsu Fujita || Muay Yoko 18 - 29kg non-title bout || Ōta, Tokyo, Japan || Decision (Majority)|| 2 || 1:30 
|-
|-  style="background:#cfc;"
| 2012-04-15 || Win ||align=left| Nene Machiya || 5th Bigbang Amateur Competition || Ōta, Tokyo, Japan || KO||  ||  
|-
|-  style="background:#cfc;"
| 2012-03-25 || Win ||align=left| Hibiki Arai || APKF Amateur Kickboxing Competition || Ōta, Tokyo, Japan || Decision || 2 || 1:30 
|-
|-  style="background:#FFBBBB;"
| 2011-08-07 || Loss ||align=left| Ryuya Okuwaki || Muay Yoko 16 -  || Yokohama, Japan || Decision (unanimous)|| Ex.1 || 1:30 
|-
|-  style="background:#cfc;"
| 2011-06-05 || Win ||align=left| Sera Sugihara || Muay Yoko 15, Kids 26kg class tournament Quarter-final || Ōta, Tokyo, Japan || TKO || 1 || 1:30 
|-
! style=background:white colspan=9 |
|-  style="background:#cfc;"
| 2010-08-08 || Win ||align=left| Taiyō Satō || Muay Yoko 13 - 22-24kg class non-title bout || Yokohama, Japan || Decision (majority)|| 2 || 1:30 
|-  style="background:#cfc;"
| 2010-04-25 || Win ||align=left| Hyūga Umemoto || Muay Yoko 12 - 0-22kg class non-title bout || Yokohama, Japan || Decision (unanimous) || 2 || 1:30 
|-
|-
| colspan=9 | Legend''':

See also
 List of male kickboxers
 List of IBF Muaythai world champions
 List of WBC Muaythai world champions

References

External links
 Eiwa Sports Gym
 

|-

|-

|-

|-

|-

|-

|-

2001 births
Living people
Japanese male kickboxers
Sportspeople from Kanagawa Prefecture